Sharon Rotbard (Hebrew שרון רוטברד) (born October 2, 1959), is an Israeli architect, publisher and author, senior lecturer at the Architecture department in the Bezalel Academy, Jerusalem.

Biography
Sharon Rotbard was born in Tel Aviv. He studied fine arts between 1982 and 1984 at HaMidrasha Art College with Raffi Lavie, Tamar Getter and Michal Na'aman. Between 1985 and 1991 he studied architecture in Paris at the École Spéciale d'Architecture with Bernard Tschumi, Jean Nouvel and Paul Virilio.

Architecture and publishing career
After returning to Israel in 1993, Rotbard worked until 1997 as a project architect at Yasky and partners, a leading Israeli architectural firm.

In 1995, with his wife Amit, he founded Babel publishers, one of Israel's first independent presses. Since 1998, he has directed the first architecture book series in Israel at Babel and published major architectural classic titles such as Le Corbusier's Toward A New Architecture.

In 2000 Rotbard launched the press' website, Israel's first cultural Hebrew website, known today as readingmachine. That same year, Rotbard and Babel moved to a concrete house he designed and built in Shapira neighborhood at the south of Tel Aviv.

Since 2004 Rotbard has been directing The Library of Babel, the fiction series of Babel, in which he has published translated titles by Georges Perec, Nadine Gordimer, Michel Houellebecq, Marie Ndiaye, Thomas Bernhard, R.K. Narayan, Atiq Rahimi, Marek van der Jagt, Harry Mathews, as well as young Israeli authors.

In 2008, Rotbard founded a new architectural practice collective, Babel architectures, which was selected as one of the teams of the Ordos 100 project in Inner Mongolia (China).

Published works
 
 
 
 
 
 

Rotbard's first book White City, Black City (Hebrew עיר לבנה, עיר שחורה), on Jaffa and Tel Aviv's histories appeared in 2005. The book challenges the official historiography of Tel Aviv and traces its relationship with Jaffa.
    
His second book Avraham Yasky, Concrete Architecture  a monograph on the work of Avraham Yasky, was published in 2007. The book traces the history of Israeli architecture through Yasky's career and shows its development from the concrete social architecture of the early Fifties to the commercial architecture of the 21st century.

Awards and recognition
Rotbard is a recipient of the Graham Foundation 2008 grant and was selected to the Ledig House international writers' Residency program.

Selected projects
 1991, Europan2, cited project
 1994, Ramat gan Museum of Israeli Art, with Efrat-Kovalsky (unbuilt)
 1997, Rubinstin Towers, with Avraham Yasky and Yossy Sivan
 2000, town houses in South Tel Aviv
 2003, Tel Aviv Museum of Art competition
 2005, Hadera Democratic school competition (2nd prize)
 2009, ORDOS 100 Villa
 2010, South Tel Aviv urban strategic plan, in association with local residents and planners

See also
Architecture of Israel

References

Living people
1959 births
Israeli architects
Architecture writers
Israeli non-fiction writers
Israeli historians
Historians of Israel
Historiography of Israel
Israeli publishers (people)
People from Tel Aviv
Academic staff of Bezalel Academy of Arts and Design
École Spéciale d'Architecture alumni
HaMidrasha – Faculty of the Arts alumni